Samia Moualfi is the Algerian Minister of Environment and Renewable Energy. She was appointed as minister on 7 July 2021.

Education 
Moualfi holds a Doctor of Law in International Law and International Relations.

References

External links 

 Ministry of Environment and Renewable Energy

Living people
21st-century Algerian politicians
Algerian politicians
Government ministers of Algeria
Year of birth missing (living people)

Algerian politician stubs